George Treby may refer to:

Sir George Treby (judge) (1643–1700), British judge and Member of Parliament
George Treby (politician) (1684–1742), British politician and Secretary at War, eldest son of the above
George Treby (younger) (c.1726–1761), MP for Plympton Erle, son of the above
George Hele Treby (c.1727–1763), MP for Plympton Erle, younger brother of the above
George Treby (British Army officer) (168c. 5–?), British Army officer and politician